This is a list of schools in Telford and Wrekin in the English county of Shropshire.

State-funded schools

Primary schools 

Apley Wood Primary School, Hadley
Aqueduct Primary School, Aqueduct
Captain Webb Primary School, Dawley
Church Aston Infant School, Church Aston
Coalbrookdale and Ironbridge CE Primary School, Coalbrookdale
Crudgington Primary School, Crudgington
Dawley CE Primary Academy, Dawley
Donnington Wood CE Junior School, Donnington
Donnington Wood Infant School, Donnington
Dothill Primary School, Wellington
Grange Park Primary School, Stirchley
Hadley Learning Community, Hadley
High Ercall Primary School, High Ercall
Hollinswood Primary School, Hollinswood
Holmer Lake Primary School, Brookside
John Fletcher Of Madeley Primary School, Madeley
John Randall Primary School, Madeley
Ladygrove Primary School, Dawley
Lantern Academy, Ketley Bank
Lawley Primary School, Lawley
Lawley Village Academy, Lawley
Lightmoor Village Primary School, Lightmoor
Lilleshall Primary School, Lilleshall
Meadows Primary School, Ketley
Millbrook Primary School, Leegomery
Moorfield Primary School, Newport
Muxton Primary School, Muxton
Newdale Primary School, Newdale
Newport CE Junior School, Newport
Newport Infant School, Newport
Old Park Primary School, Malinslee
Priorslee Academy, Priorslee
Randlay Primary School, Randlay
Redhill Primary Academy, Priorslee
St Georges CE Primary School, St Georges
St Lawrence CE Primary School, Preston upon the Weald Moors
St Luke's RC Primary School, Trench
St Mary's RC Primary School, Madeley
St Matthew's CE Primary School, Donnington
St Patrick's RC Primary School, Wellington
St Peter and Paul RC Primary School, Newport
St Peter's CE Academy, Bratton
St Peter's CE Primary School, Edgmond
Short Wood Primary School, Wellington
Sir Alexander Fleming Primary School, Sutton Hill
Teagues Bridge Primary School, Trench
Tibberton Primary School, Tibberton
William Reynold's Primary School, Woodside
Windmill Primary School, Brookside
Wombridge Primary School, Oakengates
Woodlands Primary School, Madeley
Wrekin View Primary School, Wellington
Wrockwardine Wood CE Junior School, Wrockwardine Wood
Wrockwardine Wood Infant School, Wrockwardine Wood

Non-selective secondary schools 

Burton Borough School, Newport
Charlton School, Wellington
Ercall Wood Academy, Wellington
Haberdashers' Abraham Darby, Madeley
Hadley Learning Community, Hadley
Holy Trinity Academy, Priorslee
Madeley Academy, Madeley
The Telford Langley School, Dawley
Telford Park School, Stirchley
Telford Priory School, Wrockwardine Wood
Thomas Telford School, Telford Town Centre

Grammar schools 
Haberdashers' Adams, Newport
Newport Girls' High School, Newport

Special and alternative schools 
The Bridge at HLC, Hadley
Haughton School, Madeley
Kickstart Academy, Wellington
Queensway, Dawley
Southall School, Dawley

Further education 
Telford College

Independent schools

Primary and preparatory schools 
Castle House School, Newport
The Old Hall School, Wellington

Senior and all-through schools 
Wrekin College, Wellington

Special and alternative schools
Aspris Telford School, Coalbrookdale
Overley Hall School, Wellington
The Retreat, Ercall Heath
Rodenhurst School, Rodington
The Seeds School, Horsehay

See also 
List of schools in Shropshire

References

Telford and Wrekin
Schools in Telford and Wrekin